Thomas Ernest Aldredge (February 28, 1928 – July 22, 2011) was an American television, film and stage actor.

He won a Daytime Emmy Award for playing the role of Shakespeare in Henry Winkler Meets William Shakespeare (1978).  His Broadway stage career spanned five decades, including five Tony Award nominations.  He played both the Narrator and the Mysterious Man in the original Broadway cast of Into the Woods.  He also appeared on television in programs including Ryan's Hope, Damages, and Boardwalk Empire, with a notable role as Hugh De Angelis on The Sopranos.

Life and career
Aldredge was born in Dayton, Ohio, the son of Lucienne Juliet (née Marcillat) and William Joseph Aldredge, a colonel in the United States Army Air Corps. He originally planned to become a lawyer and was a Pre-Law student at the University of Dayton in the late 1940s. In 1947 he decided to pursue a career as an actor after attending a performance of the original Broadway production of A Streetcar Named Desire.

Aldredge carved out a respected career on the Broadway stage that spanned five decades, garnering five Tony Award nominations. He made his Broadway debut as Danny in the 1959 musical The Nervous Set. In 1972 he won a Drama Desk Award for his portrayal of Ozzie, the father of a blinded Vietnam veteran, in David Rabe's Sticks and Bones. He played Henry VIII's fool, Will Sommers, in Richard Rodgers' penultimate musical Rex in 1976. He originated the role of Norman Thayer Jr. in On Golden Pond in 1978, earning a Drama Desk Award nomination. His best-known role, however, was that of the Narrator/Mysterious Man in Stephen Sondheim and James Lapine's Into the Woods, a role he originated on Broadway and later repeated in the PBS American Playhouse production and the 1997 tenth anniversary concert. He also created the role of Doctor Tambourri in another Sondheim/Lapine collaboration, Passion.

He was part of the 1997 all-star revival of Inherit the Wind produced by Tony Randall, playing Rev. Brown in an ensemble that also included George C. Scott, Charles Durning, and Anthony Heald.

In 1960 Theodore Flicker founded a professional Off-Broadway coffee house theater, The Premise at 154 Bleecker Street in Greenwich Village.  He recruited Tom Aldredge along with Joan Darling, George Segal and Dolores Welber as the initial improvisational cast fielding and reacting to suggestions from their audience.

He had a 50-year-long career working as a character actor on television and film. He won a Daytime Emmy Award in 1978 for his portrayal of William Shakespeare in the episode Henry Winkler Meets William Shakespeare on the program The CBS Festival of Lively Arts for Young People. His best-known television role was that of Tony Soprano's father-in-law, Hugh De Angelis, on the HBO series The Sopranos.

Personal life
He was married to stage and screen costume designer Theoni V. Aldredge from 1953 until her death on January 21, 2011.

Death
Aldredge died July 22, 2011, under hospice in Tampa, Florida from lymphoma. He was 83 years old.
Aldredge Died during the filming of Boardwalk Empire episode Two Boats and a Lifeguard in which he died in the episode.

Filmography

Film

The Mouse on the Moon (1963) - Wendover
The Troublemaker (1964) - Jack Armstrong
Who Killed Teddy Bear? (1965)   -   Adler
The Boston Strangler (1968) - Harold Lacey (uncredited)
The Rain People (1969) - Mr. Alfred
The Rehearsal (1974)
Countdown at Kusini (1976) - Ben Amed
Full Moon High (1981) - Jailer
Seize the Day (1986) - Rappaport
Batteries Not Included (1987) - Sid Hogenson
See You in the Morning (1989) - Beth's Father
Brenda Starr (1989) - (fake) Captain Borg
What About Bob? (1991) - Mr. Guttman
Other People's Money (1991) - Ozzie
The Adventures of Huck Finn (1993) - Dr. Robinson
The Stars Fell on Henrietta (1995) - Grizzled Old Man
Commandments (1997) - Mr. Mann
Lawn Dogs (1997) - Trent's Father
Rounders (1998) - Judge Marinacci
Message in a Bottle (1999) - Hank Land
A Stranger in the Kingdom (1999) - Elijah Kinneson
Camouflage (2001) - Lionel Pond
The American Astronaut (2001) - Old Man
Intolerable Cruelty (2003) - Herb Myerson
Cold Mountain (2003) - Blind Man
Wrigley (2004, Short) - Tony
Game 6 (2005) - Michael Rogan
Twilight's Last Gleaming (2005, Short) - Virginia's Husband
All the King's Men (2006) - Banker
Delirious (2006) - Carl Galantine - Les's Father
The Assassination of Jesse James by the Coward Robert Ford (2007) - Major George Hite
Diminished Capacity (2008) - Wendell Kendall
My Sassy Girl - Old Man
A Magic Helmet (2010, Short) - David / Wotan

Television

The Seasons of Youth (1961)   -   Premise Player
Ten Blocks on the Camino Real (1966)   -   Baron de Charlus
N.Y.P.D.   -   Mr Mahoney (1 episode, 1969)
The Happiness Cage (1972)
Sticks and Bones (1973)
Wide World Mystery   -   Nemith (1 episode, 1974)
King Lear (1974)   -   Fool
The Adams Chronicles (1976)   -   James McHenry
The CBS Festival of Lively Arts for Young People   -   William Shakespeare (1 episode, 1977)
The Storyteller (1977)   -   Frank Eberhardt
Ryan's Hope   -   Matt Pearse (34 episodes between 1979 and 1982)
The Man That Corrupted Hadleyburg (1980)   -   Edward Richards
Nurse (1980)   -   Kelly O'Brien
The Gentleman Bandit (1981)   -   Monsignor
Love, Sidney (1981)
CBS Library   -   Host/Washington Irving (1 episode, 1982)
The American Snitch (1983)   -   Captain Crackers
Puddn'head Wilson (1984)   -   Judge Driscoll
Doubletake (1985)   -   Glendon Lane
Heartbreak House (1985)   -   Mazzini
A Special Friendship (1987)   -   Jefferson Davis
CBS Schoolbreak Special   -   Joseph Hauptmann (1 episode, 1989)
American Playhouse   -   Older Edward (1 episode, 1990)
Into the Woods (1991)   -   Narrator / Mysterious Man
Separate but Equal (1991)
Lincoln and the War Within (1992)   -  William H. Seward
O Pioneers! (1992)   -   Ivar
Barbarians at the Gate (1993)   -   Charlie Hugel
In the Best of Families: Marriage, Pride & Madness (1994)
New York News   -   (1 episode, 1995)
Andersonville (1996)   -   Sgt Horace Trimble
Harvest of Fire (1996)   -   Jacob Hostetler
Passion (1996)   -   Dr Tambourri
Earthly Possessions   -   Spry Old Man (1 episode, 1999)
Now and Again   -   Mr Leflin (1 episode, 1999)
Third Watch   -   (1 episode, 2000)
Law & Order   -   Retired Props Clerk (1 episode, 2000)
The Sopranos   -   Hugh DeAngelis (23 episodes between 2000 and 2007)
Law & Order: Criminal Intent   -   Attorney George Knowles (1 episode, 2001)
Line of Fire   -   Senator Glenn  Boulder (1 episode, 2004)
Click and Clack's As the Wrench Turns   -   Professor (1 episode, 2008)
Taking Chance (2009)   -   Charlie Fitts
Damages   -   Uncle Pete (13 episodes between 2007 and 2012) (final appearance)
Boardwalk Empire   -   Ethan Thompson (5 episodes, 2010–2011)

Other works
Original Broadway Cast Album: Into the Woods (1991)   -   (performer: "Prologue: Into the Woods", "Ever After", "Act II Prologue: So Happy", "No More")
Self:  The 58th Annual Tony Awards (2004) (TV) - Nominee: Best Featured Actor in a Play

Theatre
Stock up on Pepper 'Cause Turkey's Going to War (1967)
Sticks and Bones (1972)
Where's Charley? (1975)
Vieux Carré (1977)
On Golden Pond (1979)
The Little Foxes (1981)
Into the Woods (1987)
Passion (1994)
Into the Woods (1997)
The Time of the Cuckoo (2000)
The Adventures of Tom Sawyer (2001)
The Crucible (2002)
Twentieth Century (2004)
Twelve Angry Men (2004)

References

External links

1928 births
2011 deaths
American male film actors
American male musical theatre actors
American male stage actors
American male television actors
Deaths from cancer in Florida
Daytime Emmy Award winners
Deaths from lymphoma
Drama Desk Award winners
Male actors from Dayton, Ohio